Mieke Wijaya (born Miecke Marie De Rijder; 17 March 1940 – 3 May 2022) was an Indonesian actress, model, and politician who won three Citra Awards. She was crowned the best female antagonist in Indonesian film industry along with Suzzanna and Ruth Pelupessy. Wijaya began her career as a teenager and soared to popularity by partaking a role in Usmar Ismail's commercially successful Tiga Dara, her name became increasingly popular after starring in the soap opera Losmen in 1987.

Biography
Mieke Wijaya was born Miecke Marie De Rijder on 17 March 1940, in Bandung, Dutch East Indies to De Rijder. After graduating senior high school, she studied for some time at the National Theatre Academy of Indonesia in Jakarta. During this period she was active as a singer and actress; she had made her film debut in 1954 with Gagal.

In 1956 Wijaya rose to fame as one of the stars in Perfini's Tiga Dara. The film, directed by Usmar Ismail, saw Mieke play Nana, one of three sisters raised by their grandmother after their mother's death; in 2006 Ade Irwansyah of Tabloid Bintang wrote that Tiga Dara was the eleventh best Indonesian film of all time. Over the next five years she acted in thirteen films, including five in 1961 alone. Through the 1960s, while continuing to act in films, she was a member of Teguh Karya's Teater Populer, a stage drama troupe.

Through the 1970s and 1980s Wijaya acted in numerous films, including the religious Sembilan Wali (1985), the comedy Bing Slamet Koboi Cengeng (1974), the drama Ranjang Pengantin (1973), and the romances Badai Pasti Berlalu (1977) and Dr. Karmila (1977). In 1987 she acted in three productions.

After a four-year hiatus, during 1991 Wijaya acted in two films, Saat Kukatakan Cinta and Zig Zag (Anak Jalanan). This was followed by another long hiatus from featured films: the Indonesian film industry declined drastically in the early 1990s, and Wijaya began to concentrate on television series. , her most recent feature film role was in Hanung Bramantyo's Ayat-Ayat Cinta.

Wijaya won two Citra Awards for Best Leading Actress, one in 1967 for Gadis Kerudung Putih and one in 1981 for Kembang Semusim. She also received a Citra Award for Best Supporting Actress in 1975 for her role in Ranjang Pengantin. In 1996 she received a Surjosoemanto Prize from the National Film Board in recognition of her lengthy career, and at the 2011 Bandung Film Festival she received a Lifetime Achievement award together with Deddy Mizwar.

She was married to fellow actor Dicky Zulkarnaen (1939–1995) until his death of a stroke.  They had four children named Tirza Valentina Zulkarnaen (b. 1964), Ade Miskarana Zulkarnaen (b. 1968), Nia Zulkarnaen (b. 1970), and Barman Morgana Zulkarnaen (b. 1975). The couple's daughter Nia was nominated for a Citra Award in 1991 for her role in Lagu Untuk Seruni.

Wijaya died at her residence in Kemang, South Jakarta, on 3 May 2022, around 12:30 (UTC). Wijaya was suffered from diabetes and later discovered cancer after being hospitalized for a month in Gatot Soebroto Army Hospital at the age of 82.

Her funeral was held at Tanah Kusir Cemetery, Kebayoran Lama, on 4 May 2022. Among the mourners were Deddy Mizwar, Tio Pakusadewo, and Roy Marten.

Filmography
Wijaya acted in over seventy films during her fifty-year career.Gagal (1955)Tjorak Dunia (1955)Pilihlah Aku (1956)Tiga Dara (1956)Dekat Dimata Djauh Dihati (1956)Dewi (1957)Delapan Pendjuru Angin (1957)Sengketa (1957)Bing Slamet Tukang Betja (1959)Iseng (1959)Sekedjap Mata (1959)Gadis Diseberang Djalan (1960)Piso Surit (1960)Detik-detik Berbahaja (1961)Aksi Kalimantan (1961)Masih Ada Hari Esok (1961)Mira (1961)Toha, Pahlawan Bandung Selatan (1961)Anak-anak Revolusi (1964)Ekspedisi Terakhir (1964)Impian Bukit Harapan (1964)Langkah-langkah Dipersimpangan (1965)Liburan Seniman (1965)Gita Taruna (1966)Disela-sela Kelapa Sawit (1967)Gadis Kerudung Putih (1967)Big Village (1969)Tokoh (1973)Ananda (1970)Beranak dalam Kubur (1971)Dunia Belum Kiamat (1971)Malam Jahanam (1971)Spy and Journalist (1971)Akhir Cinta di Atas Bukit (1972)Lingkaran Setan (1972)Romusha (1972)Desa di Kaki Bukit (1972)Dosa Siapa (1972)Flamboyant (1972)Dimana Kau Ibu (1973)Ita Si Anak Pungut (1973)Bing Slamet Koboi Cengeng (1974)Demi Cinta (1974)Kehormatan (1974)Sayangilah Daku (1974)Boni dan Nancy (1974)Ranjang Pengantin (1974)Kawin Lari (1974)Perkawinan dalam Semusim (1976)Badai Pasti Berlalu (1977)Selimut Cinta (1977)Diana (1977)Ali Topan Anak Jalanan (1977)Napsu Serakah (1977)Manager Hotel (1977)Jaringan Antar Benua (1978)Senja di Pulo Putih (1978)Kembang Semusim (1980)Srigala (1981)Ketika Cinta Harus Memilih (1981)Nila di Gaun Putih (1981)Remang-remang Jakarta (1981)Dr. Karmila (1981)Betapa Damai Hati Kami (1981)Hukum Karma (1982)Pengabdian (1984)Kontraktor (1984)Sembilan Wali (1985)Gadis Hitam Putih (1985)Gerhana (1985)Beri Aku Waktu (1986)Pernikahan Dini (1987)Penginapan Bu Broto (1987)Luka di Atas Luka (1987)Saat Kukatakan Cinta (1991)Zig Zag (Anak Jalanan) (1991)Ayat-Ayat Cinta'' (2008)

Awards and nominations

References

Works cited

External links

1940 births
2022 deaths
Indo people
Citra Award winners
Indonesian film actresses
Indonesian Muslims
People from Bandung
Indonesian people of Australian descent
Indonesian people of Dutch descent
Sundanese people
Indonesian television actresses
20th-century Indonesian actresses
21st-century Indonesian actresses